South Harting is a village within Harting civil parish in the Chichester district of West Sussex, England.

South Harting has two churches, one Anglican and one Congregational, plus a school and a pub.

History
South Harting, along with the hamlets of West Harting and East Harting, was listed in the Domesday Book of 1086 as the large Manor of Harting (Hertinges). Apart from three generations of the Earls Montgomery the manor was in the possession of the Crown until 1610, when it was granted to the Caryll family. In 1746 the manor was purchased by the Featherstonhaugh family, in whose possession it remains.

In 1861 the parish covered  and had a population of 1,247.

Amenities

Churches

The Anglican parish church of St Mary and St Gabriel is at the southwestern end of the village street, in an elevated position. It has a coppered spire on the tower and a peal of six bells. Major restoration work was carried out in the 1850s, and In 2010 further improvements were made including the building of an attached room for the Sunday school.

In the churchyard is the tall South Harting War Memorial Cross, (1920)  a World War I memorial by Eric Gill with the bas relief of St Patrick attributed to Gill being by Hilary Stratton.

South Harting has a Congregational Church.

Education
Harting Church of England Primary School takes children from four to eleven years old. Alongside the school is the village hall from which a pre-school group operates.

Public houses
Harting now has just one pub, The White Hart, a Grade II listed building that includes six bedrooms (and bathrooms). Only forty years ago the village had three pubs. The White Hart is owned and operated by Upham Breweries, a local Hampshire company.

Sport

In the 1920s Harting Hill (now the B2141 road) was the venue for one of the most important motor hill climbs in the country, with Frazer Nash, Aston Martin and Raymond Mays (Bugatti) participating. The event was founded by Earl Russell in 1905.

Harting Cricket Club serves all the Hartings. Harting have a football Club playing in the West Sussex Football League.

Events 
Every Whit Monday Harting celebrates the Festivities. Since 1880, the Harting Old Club has had its annual meeting on Whit Monday and the village Festivities started in 1961,  replacing a traditional funfair which used to take centre stage in the street. All money raised at the Festivities goes to local groups and charity.
In 2022, for this year only, the Festivities will be held on Friday 03 June.

Notable people

The painter Theodore Garman worked and painted in the village and is buried in the parish church graveyard. The Victorian writer Anthony Trollope spent the last years of his life in South Harting. He moved here in 1880 and lived at The Grange.  His pen, paperknife and letter scales are on display in the parish church. H.G Wells sometimes lived at Uppark as a young man; his mother was a lady's maid there. Bertrand Russell and his wife Dora founded the experimental Beacon Hill School at  Telegraph House, which was their residence in 1927. Admiral Sir Horace Law lived in South Harting and was a lay preacher at the parish church, where a room is named after him. Television presenter and producer Cliff Michelmore (1919-2016) was a local resident and was buried in the graveyard of the parish church in 2016.

References

Further reading
 Rev. H.D. Gordon, The History of Harting (1877) Internet Archive (free to download)
 'Harting', A History of the County of Sussex: Volume 4: The Rape of Chichester (1953), pp. 10–21 British History Online

External links

 South Harting Parish Council
 History of South Harting on GENUKI
 History and old photographs of Harting

Villages in West Sussex